Jasandra Joseph (born 5 October 1998) is a Trinidad and Tobago footballer who plays as a midfielder for Trincity Nationals and the Trinidad and Tobago women's national team.

International career
Joseph played for Trinidad and Tobago at senior level in the 2020 CONCACAF Women's Olympic Qualifying Championship qualification.

References

External links

1998 births
Living people
Women's association football midfielders
Trinidad and Tobago women's footballers
Trinidad and Tobago women's international footballers